Kisii County is a county in the former Nyanza Province in southwestern Kenya. Its capital and largest town is Kisii. The county has a population of 1,266,860 people. It borders Nyamira County to the North East, Narok County to the South, and Homabay and Migori Counties to the West. The county covers an area of 1,317.5 km.

People

The county is inhabited mostly by the Gusii people.

Demographics 
There is total population of 1,266,860 of which 605,784 are males, 661,038 females and 38 intersex persons. There are 308,054 household with an average household size of 4.1 persons per household and a population density 958 people per square kilometre.

Climatic conditions 
Kisii receives an average rainfall of 1500 millimeters, with long rains falling in March and June. Maximum temperature range between 21 °C – 30 °C (69.8 °F – 86 °F) and minimum temperatures range between 15 °C – 20 °C (59 °F – 68 °F).

Administrative and political units

County leadership 
Simba Arati is the current governor after clinching the seat with 270,928 votes in the 2022 election. Robert Monda serves as his deputy, Richard Onyoka as the county senator, and Donya Toto as the county Woman Representative at the National Assembly.

James Ongwae was the first governor after being elected in 2013 and re-elected in 2017 for a second and final term. He was deputized by Joash Maangi Gongera. Prof. Samson Ongeri is the senator and joined office in 2017 after flooring the first senator of the county Chris Obure.Janet Ongera is the woman representative and second to hold office, Mary Keraa-Otara being the first elected women representative.

For Kisii County, the County Executive Committee comprises:-

Source

Administrative units 
There are nine constituencies, eleven sub-counties, forty five county assembly wards, one hundred and three locations and two hundred and thirty seven sub-locations.

Political units 
The county has nine electoral constituencies: The county has eleven sub-counties. They are derived from the same constituency boundaries but two constituencies, Bobasi and South Mugirango, have two sub-counties each. The sub-counties often work directly with national government.

Bobasi Constituency
 Nyamache sub-county
 Sameta sub-county
Bonchari Constituency
 Kisii South sub-county
Bomachoge Borabu Constituency
 Kenyenya sub-county
Bomachoge Chache Constituency
 Gucha sub-county
Kitutu Chache North Constituency
 Marani sub-county
Kitutu Chache South Constituency
 Kitutu Central sub-county
Nyaribari Chache Constituency
 Kisii Central sub-county
Nyaribari Masaba Constituency
 Masaba South sub-county
South Mugirango Constituency
 Etago sub-county
 Gucha South sub-county

Education 
There are 1079 ECD centres 1081 primary schools and 371 secondary schools. The county has also 1 teachers training colleges, 49 Youth Polytechnics, 63 Technical, vocational education and training (VET) 158 adult training, 1 University and 3 university campuses.

Source

Health 
There are a total of 168 health facilities in the county with one county referral hospital. County has 462 health personnel of different cadre.

*FBO – Faith Based Organizations

Source

Transport and communication 
The county is covered by 1,131.8 km of road network. of this 669.2 km is covered by earth surface, 292.6 km is murram surface and 170 km is covered by bitumen.

Trade and commerce 
There are 102 trading centres, 16,199 registered businesses, 12,110 licensed retail traders, 49 supermarkets, 365 licensed wholesale traders.

See also 
Nyamira County

External links 
Kisii.com
Fulda-Mosocho-Project – one of the most successful projects on FGM – nominated for the Sakharov-prize 2006
Kisii Language – Kisii English- Ekegusii translation
NPR story about Kisii language

References

 
Counties of Kenya